James Alan Montgomery (June 13, 1866 – February 6, 1949) was an American Episcopal clergyman, Oriental scholar, and biblical scholar who was professor of Old Testament and Semitics (Hebrew and Aramaic), first at the Philadelphia Divinity School, and later, from 1913 to 1948, at the University of Pennsylvania. He served as president of the American Oriental Society and Society of Biblical Literature and Exegesis.

Montgomery was born in Germantown, Philadelphia, the eldest son of Thomas Harrison Montgomery, a businessman, and Anna Morton Montgomery. He graduated from the University of Pennsylvania in 1887, and the Philadelphia Divinity School in 1890.

Books
 Commentaries on the books of Kings and Daniel
 A Critical and Exegetical Commentary on the Books of Kings, T. & T. Clark, (1951)
 A Critical and Exegetical Commentary on the Book of Daniel, T. & T. Clark,+ (1927)
 The Samaritans: The Earliest Jewish Sect; Their History, Theology and Literature, J.C. Winston Company (1907)
 Aramaic Incantation Texts from Nippur, University Museum (1913)
 The Origin of the Gospel according to St. John, John C. Winston Co. (1923)
 History of Yaballaha III, Nestorian Patriarch and of His Vicar Bar Sauma, Mongol Ambassador to the Frankish Courts at the End of the Thirteenth Century, Columbia University Press (1927)
 Arabia and the Bible, University of Pennsylvania Press (1934)
 The Ras Shamra Mythological Texts, with Zellig S. Harris (1935)
 The Holy City and Gehenna

References

1866 births
1949 deaths
American biblical scholars
American Episcopal priests
University of Pennsylvania faculty
Anglican biblical scholars
Clergy from Philadelphia